The Hamro Foundation Essex Cricket League is the top level of competition for recreational club cricket in Essex and East London, England. The league was founded in 1972. Since 1999 it has been a designated ECB Premier League.

Champions
 

 

 

Source:

Championships won

Performance by season from 1999

References

External links
 Essex League – Official website
 Essex League – play-cricket website

English domestic cricket competitions
Premier League
1972 establishments in England
Sports leagues established in 1972
ECB Premier Leagues